State Correctional Institution – Cresson was a medium-security, all male correctional facility, located off U.S. Route 22, about 10 miles west of Altoona along Old Route 22 in the Western part of the commonwealth of Pennsylvania.

On January 8, 2013 state officials announced the prison would be closed. The prison closed June 30, 2013 and the land was put up for sale by the state.

Creation of SCI-Cresson
Under Executive Order of then-Governor Dick Thornburgh in January, 1983, This facility, formerly the Lawrence Frick State Hospital for the mentally ill, was to be transferred to the Bureau of Corrections for its current use. The construction/renovation process at Cresson was allocated at $20.6 Million. Construction/renovation began in 1984, and the design of the new housing units for inmates was prototyped in future institutions across the Commonwealth. The activation team was created in the fall of 1986. SCI Cresson opened in 1987, becoming a medium-security correctional facility for men.

Notable inmates
Joseph Kallinger - Serial killer and rapist; died in 1996 
John du Pont - Convicted murderer

See also
List of Pennsylvania state prisons

References

External links
Penna. Department of Corrections - SCI Cresson

Prisons in Pennsylvania
Buildings and structures in Cambria County, Pennsylvania
1987 establishments in Pennsylvania